Garra bispinosa is a species of cyprinid fish in the genus Garra from Yunnan.

References 

Garra
Fish described in 2005